The 1956–57 NBA season was the Nationals' 8th season in the NBA.

Regular season

Season standings

x – clinched playoff spot

Record vs. opponents

Game log

Playoffs

|- align="center" bgcolor="#ccffcc" 
| 1
| March 16
| @ Philadelphia
| W 103–96
| Red Kerr (25)
| Red Kerr (21)
| Dolph Schayes (6)
| Philadelphia Civic Center
| 1–0
|- align="center" bgcolor="#ccffcc" 
| 2
| March 18
| Philadelphia
| W 91–80
| Red Kerr (22)
| Dolph Schayes (20)
| Schayes, Conlin (4)
| Onondaga War Memorial
| 2–0
|-

|- align="center" bgcolor="#ffcccc" 
| 1
| March 21
| @ Boston
| L 90–108
| Dolph Schayes (21)
| Dolph Schayes (23)
| Boston Garden
| 0–1
|- align="center" bgcolor="#ffcccc" 
| 2
| March 23
| Boston
| L 105–120
| Dolph Schayes (31)
| Dolph Schayes (15)
| Onondaga War Memorial
| 0–2
|- align="center" bgcolor="#ffcccc" 
| 3
| March 24
| @ Boston
| L 80–83
| Dolph Schayes (22)
| Dolph Schayes (17)
| Boston Garden
| 0–3
|-

Awards and records
Dolph Schayes, All-NBA First Team

References

Philadelphia 76ers seasons
Syracuse